is a railway station of JR Kyushu Nippō Main Line in Kagoshima, Kagoshima, Japan. It is an unmanned station with a ticket machine and a bathroom.

Lines 
Kyushu Railway Company
Nippō Main Line

JR

Adjacent stations

Nearby places

Japan National Route 10

Railway stations in Japan opened in 1901
Railway stations in Kagoshima Prefecture
Buildings and structures in Kagoshima